1997 in Korea may refer to:
1997 in North Korea
1997 in South Korea